Cumbria County Council is the county council for the non-metropolitan county of Cumbria in the North West of England. Established in April 1974, following its first elections held the previous year, it is an elected local government body responsible for the most significant local services in the area, including schools, roads, and social services.

In July 2021 the government announced that in April 2023, the county council will be abolished and its functions transferred to two new unitary authorities: Cumberland Council and Westmorland and Furness Council.

Creation
In 1974, under the Local Government Act 1972, the administrative counties of Cumberland and Westmorland and the county borough of Carlisle were abolished, and the areas they covered were combined with parts of Lancashire and the  West Riding of Yorkshire to form a new non-metropolitan county called Cumbria.

Functions
Cumbria County Council is responsible for the more strategic local services of the county, including education (schools, both primary and secondary), libraries and youth services, social services, highway maintenance, waste disposal, emergency planning, consumer protection, and town and country planning for minerals matters, waste and for highways. This makes it a substantial employer.

The former Cumberland County Council's final major road scheme, an A66 bypass for Keswick, was prepared by Scott Wilson Kirkpatrick, consulting engineers, in 1972, and construction began in the summer of 1974, with the new authority completing the scheme.

The Council operates various recycling and waste disposal facilities across the area. In January 2012, the Council announced plans to close six of these centres. The six sites identified by the review as most suitable for closure are at Ambleside, Brampton, Grange-over-Sands, Kirkby Stephen, Millom and Wigton.

The administrative offices are at Cumbria House in Botchergate, Carlisle, and formal meetings of the Council are held at the County Offices in Kendal.

History
Control of the council swung back and forth. In its first four years (1973-1977) there was no overall control, but in 1977 the Conservatives gained a majority. In 1981, this became a majority for Labour, and from 1985 there was again no one-party control. In 1997, Labour again took control, but they lost it in 2001. In the final years of its existence there again was no party with a majority.

A proposal for Cumbria to become a unitary authority was made in 2007, and Cumbria went into consultation, with opposition coming from the district councils which would be abolished: Allerdale, Barrow-in-Furness, Carlisle, Copeland, Eden, and South Lakeland. In the event, the county was left out of the 2009 structural changes to local government in England.

In 2008, the county council rejected a proposal to introduce a directly elected mayor, opting instead for a cabinet-style administration that resembled the status quo. During the same year, an administration of Conservatives and Liberal Democrats collapsed, suffering not least from lacking a majority in the council. Thirty-nine Labour members and three Independents exactly equalled the total of thirty-two Conservatives and ten Liberal Democrats. A minority Labour administration then took over running the council until the June 2009 elections, when a net gain of one seat from the Independents led to the creation of a new Conservative and Labour coalition.

In 2020 the council approved Whitehaven coal mine for a third time. It will be the first deep coal mine in the UK in 30 years. The approval was widely criticised for its environmental damage and carbon emissions. Westmorland and Lonsdale MP Tim Farron described the coal mine as a "complete disaster for our children's future".

In July 2021 the Ministry of Housing, Communities and Local Government announced that in April 2023, the county will be reorganised into two unitary authorities.  Cumbria County Council is to be abolished and its functions transferred to the new authorities.  An eastern authority, to be known as Westmorland and Furness Council, will cover the current districts of Barrow-in-Furness, Eden, and South Lakeland, and a new western authority, to be known as Cumberland Council, will cover the current districts of Allerdale, Carlisle, and Copeland.

Elections

The first elections to the authority were in 1973, and members have been elected since then every four years for a four-year term of office, with elections being held all together on the "first past the post" system.

Since boundary changes in 2001, 84 councillors have been elected from 84 single-member electoral divisions.

At the June 2009 elections, the outcome was 38 Conservatives members, 24 Labour, 16 Liberal Democrats and six Independents. A Labour-Conservative coalition was formed.

Following the May 2013 elections the outcome was 35 Labour members, 26 Conservative, 16 Liberal Democrats and 7 Independents. A Labour-Lib Dem coalition was formed. Following the  May 2017 elections, the outcome was 37 Conservative, 26 Labour, 16 Liberal Democrats and 5 Independents, resulting in a Labour-Lib Dem coalition with support from Independent members.

The 2021 election was postponed on 10 April 2021.  In view of the council's abolition there was no election to the council in 2022.

Political control
Since 1973 the political control of the council has been as follows:

Notable members
Tim Westoll, first chairman of the council, previously chairman of Cumberland County Council from 1959 to 1974.

See also

2009 Cumbria Council election
County council

Notes

 
Local government in Cumbria
History of Cumbria
Politics of Cumbria
County councils of England
1974 establishments in England
Local education authorities in England
Local authorities in Cumbria
Major precepting authorities in England
Leader and cabinet executives
Organizations established in 1974
2023 disestablishments in England
Organizations disestablished in 2023